James McCaffrey (born 12 October 1951 in Luton) is a former professional footballer, who played for Nottingham Forest, Mansfield Town, Huddersfield Town, Portsmouth and Northampton Town.

References

1951 births
Living people
English footballers
Footballers from Luton
People educated at St Columba's College, St Albans
Association football midfielders
English Football League players
Nottingham Forest F.C. players
Mansfield Town F.C. players
Huddersfield Town A.F.C. players
Portsmouth F.C. players
Northampton Town F.C. players